Ali Abad Japlogh may refer to:
 Aliabad, Azna, Lorestan Province
 Aliabad, Ashna Khvor, Markazi Province
 Aliabad, Kamareh, Markazi Province